Distributed network may refer to:

 Computer network
 Distributed computing
 Stand-alone power system

See also
 Decentralization
 Distributed manufacturing
 Distributed social network